Hoffmeister is a German surname. Notable people with the surname include:

 Bert Hoffmeister (1907–1999), Canadian Army officer, businessman, and conservationist
 Cuno Hoffmeister (1892–1968), German astronomer and geophysicist, founder of Sonneberg Observatory
 Edmund Hoffmeister (1893–1951), German, Army officer, Generalleutnant
 Frank Hoffmeister (born 1965), German backstroke swimmer
 Franz Hoffmeister (1898–1943), Roman Catholic priest
 Franz Anton Hoffmeister (1754–1812), German composer and music publisher
 Freya Hoffmeister (born 1964), German expeditioner and sea-kayaker
 Gunhild Hoffmeister (born 1944), East German-German female middle-distance runner
 Jesse Hoffmeister (1872–1933), Major League Baseball player
 Werner Hoffmeister (1819–1845), German physician and botanist

See also
 1726 Hoffmeister, main-belt asteroid
 Hoffmeister (crater), lunar crater
 Hoffmeister Quartet, string quartet composed by Wolfgang Amadeus Mozart

See also 
 Hofmeister (surname)

German-language surnames
Lists of people by surname